Eriocapitella is a genus of flowering plants in the buttercup family Ranunculaceae. Plants of the genus are native to Asia. The generic name Eriocapitella roughly translates to "growing in a small woolly head", which refers to the hairy ovary and fruit of some members of the genus. Cultivated plants are commonly known as fall-blooming anemones.

Taxonomy
Eriocapitella was named by the Japanese botanist Takenoshin Nakai in 1941. It was proposed as a section of genus Anemone in 1991, but later segregated into genus Eriocapitella.

Taxa
, Kew's Plants of the World Online (POWO) accepts 6 species in the genus Eriocapitella:

An artificial hybrid is also recognized by POWO:

 Eriocapitella × hybrida (L.H.Bailey) Christenh. & Byng
 Basionym: Anemone japonica var. hybrida L.H.Bailey
 Synonym: Anemone × hybrida Paxton

The parents of the hybrid are E. japonica and E. vitifolia. Historically, the hybrid was developed in Europe after E. japonica was brought to England in 1843.

Etymology
The Latin word capitellatus (or capitellata) means "growing in a small head". Since the prefix erio- (from the Greek ἔριον) means "woolly" (or "wool"), the generic name Eriocapitella translates to "growing in a small woolly head". Presumably this refers to the hairy ovary and fruit of some of the taxa in the genus.

Distribution
Plants of genus Eriocapitella are native to Asia. They are found throughout the Himalaya region, across much of East Asia and Southeast Asia, ranging as far south as Sumatra.

 Western Himalaya: Afghanistan, Pakistan, India
 Eastern Himalaya: Nepal, Assam (northeast India), Tibet, Qinghai (northwest China)
 East and Southeast Asia: China, Taiwan, Vietnam, Laos, Myanmar
 South Asia: Sri Lanka

Plants of the genus have been introduced to Czechoslovakia, Ecuador, Germany, Japan, Korea, and elsewhere.

Cultivation
Plants of genus Eriocapitella have been cultivated since at least the 17th century, probably as far back as the Chinese Tang dynasty (618–907). During that time, a form of E. hupehensis with smaller, semi-double flowers and pink sepals escaped cultivation and spread across China to Japan and Korea. This form of E. hupehensis, brought to England from China by the plant explorer Robert Fortune in 1843, became known as the Japanese anemone (E. japonica). European horticulturists crossed the Japanese anemone with E. vitifolia, a wide-ranging Asian species with white sepals. Today we find a large number of Japanese anemone hybrids (E. × hybrida) with single, semi-double, or double flowers having white, pink, or purple sepals.

Fall-blooming anemones usually have white or pink blossoms with a globe-shaped seed head. Newly opened blossoms mingle with the seed heads for several weeks between late July and October. The plants thrive in light to partial shade but will tolerate full sun as long as there’s sufficient moisture. Overly wet conditions should be avoided, and mulch should be applied in the fall, especially in northern climates. Japanese beetles, black blister beetles, and foliar nematodes can be a problem.

At the Chicago Botanic Garden, Rudy experimented with 26 cultivars of fall-blooming anemones over a 5-year period beginning in 1998. The experiments evaluated various cultivars of E. hupehensis, E. × hybrida, E. japonica, and E. tomentosa. About 40% of the cultivars had a bloom length of 50 days or more. The longest bloom length recorded was 65 days.

, the following cultivars have gained the Award of Garden Merit (AGM) from the Royal Horticultural Society:

 E. hupehensis 'Bowles's Pink'
 E. × hybrida 'Elegans'
 E. hupehensis 'Hadspen Abundance'
 E. × hybrida 'Honorine Jobert'
 E. × hybrida 'Königin Charlotte' ('Queen Charlotte')

 E. japonica 'Pamina'

 E. japonica 'Rotkäppchen'
 E. × hybrida 'September Charm'

The cultivars E. × hybrida 'Andrea Atkinson', E. × hybrida 'Lady Gilmour', E. japonica 'Prinz Heinrich', and E. × hybrida 'Robustissima' were removed from the AGM list in 2013.

Bibliography

References

 
Ranunculaceae genera
Taxa named by Takenoshin Nakai